Loudon Road Historic District is a national historic district located at Loudonville in Albany County, New York. It includes 20 contributing buildings; 17 are residences and three are in commercial use.  The district encompasses representative structures from the areas growth during the 19th and early 20th century.  Notable structures include the home of Elias Ireland (ca. 1820), an early school from 1811 that was rebuilt about 1850, summer cottages from the late 19th century including that of Judge Ira Harris, and Georgian Revival homes from the early 20th century.

It was listed on the National Register of Historic Places in 1979.

References

Historic districts on the National Register of Historic Places in New York (state)
Historic districts in Albany County, New York
National Register of Historic Places in Albany County, New York
Streets in Albany, New York